The Adriatic Challenger was a professional tennis tournament played on clay courts. It was part of the Association of Tennis Professionals (ATP) Challenger Tour. It was held in Fano, Italy in 2016.

Past finals

Singles

Doubles

References

ATP Challenger Tour
Clay court tennis tournaments
Tennis tournaments in Italy